Come Over When You're Sober, Pt. 1 (often shortened to COWYS Pt. 1), is the debut studio album by American recording artist Lil Peep and the only album to be released during his lifetime. It was released on August 15, 2017, by AUTNMY via AWAL. The album was supported by four singles: "Benz Truck (гелик)", "The Brightside", "Awful Things" and "Save That Shit". Lil Peep died exactly three months after the album's release.

Following Lil Peep's death, Come Over When You're Sober, Pt. 1 peaked at number 38 on the US Billboard 200.

Background 
In 2017, Lil Peep had decided to leave his home in Los Angeles, California. The primary option was his home-town of Long Beach, New York but instead Peep opted to move to London, England, using his Swedish citizenship and passport to stay. In London, Peep's management, First Access Entertainment, who he had been signed with since August 2016 helped Peep set up with a home and studio.

Recording 
The opportunity gave Peep his first opportunity to record in a studio and was the first time he collaborated outside of his immediate circle. He began working with Rob Cavallo and eventually, Astasio, a member of the Invisible Men songwriting and production trio. Peep used to record on his microphone at home as well as at the studio, the $800 microphone being bought with his own money.

Commercial performance
Following the release of Come Over When You're Sober, Pt. 1, the album debuted in only one country, the Czech Republic on August 22, 2017. Following Lil Peep's death, Come Over When You're Sober, Pt. 1 entered the Billboard 200 at #168 and sold 16,000 album-equivalent units the following week, peaking at #38.

Sequel album
Following Lil Peep's death, his producer Smokeasac revealed that Peep had made several unreleased songs, ones specifically made for a possible sequel to this album entitled Come Over When You're Sober, Pt. 2. In a tweet shortly after Peep's death, Smokeasac tweeted that he and Peep made "beautiful music" during 2017 and that he still has unreleased music from him.

In February 2018, Smokeasac tweeted a confirmation that the album is coming, but would be released when the "time is right".

Originally not long after Lil Peep's promotional tour for the album was to wrap up, he announced on Twitter that he would be releasing an EP entitled Goth Angel Sinner, consisting of three songs produced by Fish Narc. Columbia Records later acquired Peep's unreleased material, including the EP, although the demo version of the EP was leaked in October 2018. The EP released for streaming in October 2019.

Track listing
Songwriting credits taken from BMI, production credits from Lil Peep's official SoundCloud account.

Charts

Weekly charts

Year-end charts

Certifications

References

2017 debut albums
Albums recorded in a home studio
Lil Peep albums